The fumonisins are a group of mycotoxins derived from Fusarium and their Liseola section. They have  strong structural similarity to sphinganine, the backbone precursor of sphingolipids.

More specifically, it can refer to:

 Fumonisin B1
 Fumonisin B2
 Fumonisin B3
 Fumonisin B4

The trichothecene (T-2) mycotoxins are a group of over 40 compounds produced by fungi of the genus Fusarium, a common grain mold.

The estrogenic metabolite, zearalenone, is also referred to as F-2 toxin.

As the fumonisins appear to be non-genotoxic the possibility that they belong to another class of non-genotoxic carcinogens, the peroxisome proliferators, was investigated

Genetic engineering is reported as a promising means of detoxifying mycotoxins. This approach may provide innovative solutions to the problem of fumonisin in corn.

At least 15 different fumonisins have so far been reported and other minor metabolites have been identified, although most of them have not been shown to occur naturally. In 2015, a unique class of non-aminated fumonisins was reported on grapes infected with Aspergillus welwitschiae, although their toxicities have not yet been established.

References

Mycotoxins